Sir Philip de Malpas Grey Egerton, 10th Baronet FRS (13 November 1806 – 5 April 1881) was an English palaeontologist and Conservative politician from the Egerton family.  He sat in the House of Commons variously between 1830 and his death in 1881.

Early life 

Egerton was the son of Sir Philip Grey Egerton, 9th Baronet and his wife Rebecca Du Pre, daughter of Josias Du Pre of Wilton Park, Beaconsfield.  He was educated at Eton and Christ Church, Oxford, where he graduated BA in 1828. While at college his interest in geology was aroused by the lectures of William Buckland, and by his acquaintance with William D. Conybeare.  He inherited the baronetcy on the death of his father in 1829.  He was elected Fellow of the Royal Society in 1831, and was a trustee of the British Museum.  When it was first established in 1834 he became a trustee of the Senate of the University of London.

Geological work 

While travelling in Switzerland with Lord Cole (later to be 3rd Earl of Enniskillen) they were introduced to Prof. L Agassiz at Neufchâtel, and determined to make a special study of fossil fish.  During the course of fifty years they gradually gathered together two of the largest and finest of private collections—that of Sir Philip Grey Egerton being at Oulton Park, Tarporley, Cheshire.

Egerton described the structure and affinities of numerous species in the publications of the Geological Society of London, the Geological Magazine and the Decades of the Geological Survey; and in recognition of his services the Wollaston medal was awarded to him in 1873 by the Geological Society.  He was elected FRS in 1831, and was a trustee of the British Museum. He was also a member of Grillion's Club, and compiled a history of the club's first fifty years in a book: 'Grillion's Club: From Its Origin in 1812 To Its Fiftieth Anniversary', published in 1880.

Political life 

Egerton was a prominent local dignitary, as Deputy Lieutenant of Cheshire and J.P. for the county.  He held the post in the militia as Lieutenant Colonel in the Cheshire Yeomanry. He was elected Member of Parliament for the city of Chester in 1830 but lost the seat in 1831.  He stood unsuccessfully at Cheshire South in 1832 but was elected in 1835 and held the seat until 1868. He was elected MP for West Cheshire from 1868 until his death in London on 5 April 1881.

Legacy 

Egerton's collection of fossil fishes is now in the Natural History Museum, London. He is commemorated in the scientific names of the Rusty-fronted barwing (Actinodura egertoni Gould, 1836) and Early Jurassic brittle star fossil, Palaeocoma egertoni (Broderip, 1840), although the latter is now considered a junior synonym of the type species, Palaeocoma milleri (Phillips, 1829).

The Egerton Bascule Bridge and Egerton Dock, located at Birkenhead, Wirral Peninsula, England are also named in honour of Sir Philip de Malpas Grey Egerton.

Family 
He married on 8 March 1832, Anna Elizabeth, third daughter of George John Legh
and had issue:
Sir Philip le Belward Grey-Egerton, 11th Baronet (1833–1891), married Henrietta, daughter of Albert Denison, 1st Baron Londesborough
 Lt-Col Rowland Grey-Egerton (1838–1923), died unmarried
 Anna Mary Elizabeth Grey-Egerton ( -1927), married Henry Reginald Corbet
 Cecily Louisa Grey-Egerton ( -1920), married Dunbar Douglas, 6th Earl of Selkirk

References 

Bibliography

External links 
 

1806 births
1881 deaths
English geologists
English palaeontologists
Fellows of the Royal Society
Conservative Party (UK) MPs for English constituencies
Grey-Egerton, Philip de Malpas, 10th Baronet
People educated at Eton College
Alumni of Christ Church, Oxford
UK MPs 1830–1831
Tory MPs (pre-1834)
UK MPs 1835–1837
UK MPs 1837–1841
UK MPs 1841–1847
UK MPs 1847–1852
UK MPs 1852–1857
UK MPs 1857–1859
UK MPs 1859–1865
UK MPs 1865–1868
UK MPs 1868–1874
UK MPs 1874–1880
UK MPs 1880–1885
Wollaston Medal winners